Mouy is a commune in the Oise department in northern France. This commune is located 85 kilometers from Paris. Mouy-Bury station has rail connections to Beauvais and Creil.

Population

See also
 Communes of the Oise department

References

Communes of Oise